The International Society of City and Regional Planners (ISOCARP) is a non-governmental global association of professional city and regional planners. It was founded in 1965 in a bid to bring together recognised and highly qualified spatial planners in an international network. The first president of ISOCARP was its co-founder Prof. Sam van Embden (1965-1975).

The Society has over 700+ individual and institutional members from more than +85 countries. ISOCARP is currently presided by Martin Dubbeling (NL) together with 11 members of the Board and Executive Committee from around the World with a Head Office located in The Hague, Netherlands. ISOCARP is formally accredited as an NGO by the United Nations and the Council of Europe and has a formal consultative status as a recognised NGO with UNESCO. Additionally, ISOCARP has multiple Memoranda of Understanding with a plethora of international partner organisations and institutions.

About
The objectives of ISOCARP include the improvement of cities and planning practice through the creation of a global and active network of practitioners by the exchange of experience, training, education and research. It promotes the planning profession in all its aspects and enhances public awareness and understanding of major planning issues at a global level. ISOCARP has a strong record and reputation on a number of regular activities including its annual World Planning Congress, a strong series of publications, awards for best practices, training programmes and workshops for professional support in urban planning, amongst others.

In 2016 the ISOCARP Institute, Centre for Urban Excellence emerged as the "research spin-off" of ISOCARP, operating on three pillars: Practice, Research and Academy. The Institute's prime objectives include: strengthening cross-border collaboration globally; upholding professional excellence in planning; advancing sustainable planning; increasing awareness of major development trends and promoting best practices; all while serving as an “Urban Think Tank” facilitating the generation and dissemination of knowledge for better cities.

Although ISOCARP members, planners and other stakeholders involved in the development and maintenance of the built environment, work in many different fields, they share a common interest in the spatial and environmental dimensions of urbanisation. They advise key decision-makers, proposing and supporting projects for intervention in various spatial contexts. ISOCARP is a politically and commercially independent world-wide organisation.

World Congress
ISOCARP's most prominent event is the annual World Planning Congress. Since 1965 such congresses have taken place world-wide on globally-significant cutting edge topics promoting knowledge creation and sharing in the planning profession. Attended by some 350-500 delegates, ISOCARP congresses are small enough for personal interchange of ideas on a given theme, yet big enough to encompass a broad professional and international range. The congresses are open to ISOCARP Members (reduced congress fees) and non-members (individuals, parties or organisations). The Congresses provide a platform for establishing professional as well as personal contacts with colleagues from all around the world.

Key activities

Next to the annual congress, the workshops for Young Planning Professionals (YPP) and the Urban Planning Advisory Teams (UPATs), organised on demand for cities and regions all over the world, are amongst the key activities of ISOCARP. YPP workshops are held on national level addressing local conflicts by a group of selected professionals under the age of 35. UPATs assist sponsor organisations by offering the extensive experience and expertise of ISOCARP members to work on highly relevant but complicated local or international planning projects and policy initiatives. Previous workshops took place in Russia, China, Australia, Mexico, Kenya, Gaza and the West Bank.

At the request of governmental agencies ISOCARP provides customised training programmes for planning personnel. Regional working groups and seminars are regularly organised by the National Delegations. Furthermore, the Society offers Strategic/Technical Assistance Teams for collaborative research and consulting services with national and multi-national agencies.

ISOCARP has also developed a range of online activities, both for the public and its members. Cyber Agora is ISOCARP’s virtual public space for exchanging knowledge and opinions on global urban and regional planning issues. It has established itself as a series of fruitful online events about diverse planning issues and continues to provide a public space for both, the expression of and listening to ideas. In Spring 2021 ISOCARP also announced he launch of International Regional Events: smaller-scale symposia, which focus on issues of local importance, and which can be repeated on several occasions throughout the year in different regional and macro-regional contexts

Awards 
ISOCARP recognises extraordinary planning through a variety of award programmes. The Award for Excellence is bestowed in two categories (Grand and Merit Award) and represents the highest honour acknowledged by ISOCARP, recognising exceptionally innovative urban and regional initiatives. The Gerd Albers Award is given for best publications by an ISOCARP member. The ISOCARP Student Award is bestowed in two categories (Winner and Special Mention) to a student or a group of students at all levels (undergraduate-bachelor and graduate-master) with outstanding results in urban and regional planning or related field.

Publications 
ISOCARP thematic publications support the Society's goal to create and disseminate knowledge for better cities and territories.

The ISOCARP Review, published since 2004, is the Society's annual flagship publication.

The other flagship publication is the International Manual of Planning Practice, published in 2015.

Other publications and project reports cover the several activities and initiatives of the Society. Examples are the Plan Magazines as result of the UPATs and the Young Planning Professionals’ (YPPs) Report.

References

External links
Official site

Urban planning organizations